Franz Rottland (December 4, 1934 in Gelsenkirchen – August 4, 2014) was a German linguist and Africanist.

His interests included the historical linguistics of Nilotic languages and Cushitic languages.

Biography
After receiving his doctorate on September 8, 1970 at Leiden University and his habilitation in 1979 at the University of Cologne, Rottland served as the Chair of African Studies II at the University of Bayreuth until 1998.

Rottland died in 2014 at the age of 79 and was buried in Alter Ehrenfelder Friedhof at Cologne's Melaten cemetery.

Selected publications
 Die südnilotischen Sprachen. Beschreibung, Vergleichung und Rekonstruktion. Berlin 1982, .
 editor, with Rainer Voßen: Afrikanische Wildbeuter. Internationales Symposion, Sankt Augustin, Januar 3–5, 1985 Tagungsberichte. African hunter gatherers. Hamburg 1986, .
 editor: Festschrift zum 60. Geburtstag von Carl F. Hoffmann. Hamburg 1986, .
 editor, with Lucia N. Omondi: Proceedings of the 3. Nilo-Saharan Linguistics Colloquium. Kisumu, Kenya, August 4–9, 1986. Hamburg 1991, .

References

External links
Publications at Rüdiger Köppe Verlag

Living people
1934 births
Linguists from Germany
Academic staff of the University of Bayreuth
Leiden University alumni
Linguists of Nilotic languages
Linguists of Cushitic languages
People from Gelsenkirchen